Colville (pronounced /käl-vil/) is an unincorporated community located in Harrison County, Kentucky, United States with a small portion in Bourbon County.

Landmarks
The Colville Covered Bridge, a National Registered Historic Place, was constructed in 1877 and is located on the Bourbon County side of the community. This is where Hinkston Creek flows through the community.

References

Unincorporated communities in Harrison County, Kentucky
Unincorporated communities in Kentucky